The Heisman curse is a term coined to reference a two-part assertion of a negative future for the winning player of the Heisman Trophy in American football. The "curse" supposes that any college football player who wins the Heisman plays on a team that will likely lose its subsequent bowl game. The trend of post-award failure has garnered the attention of the mainstream media. Talk of a curse in relation to bowl results was particularly prevalent from 2003 to 2008, when six Heisman Trophy winners compiled a cumulative 1–5 bowl game record, and five of those six led number one ranked teams into the Bowl Championship Series (BCS) National Championship Game as favorites (Heisman Trophy winners, including Reggie Bush, who gave back his Heisman Trophy, are 4–8 overall in the BCS National Championship Game and College Football Playoff National Championship, although prior to 2009 they were 1–6). Additionally, the Heisman curse asserts that in most cases a Heisman winner will have either a poor career in the National Football League (NFL), or in fact not even see such a football career at all. Although many Heisman winners have not enjoyed success at the professional level, including players like Matt Leinart, Andre Ware, Jason White, Rashaan Salaam, Eric Crouch, Ty Detmer, Troy Smith and Gino Torretta, proponents of the "curse" rarely cite highly successful players such as Barry Sanders, Charles Woodson, Eddie George, Tim Brown, Bo Jackson, Marcus Allen, Earl Campbell, O. J. Simpson, and Tony Dorsett among the notables.

Insofar as there is a "curse" of underperforming Heisman winners, it seems to affect quarterbacks disproportionately.  Although certain Heisman winners have gone on to win Super Bowl championships (such as Roger Staubach and Jim Plunkett), comparatively few have had successful NFL careers.  Conversely, running backs seem generally to have fared better in the professional ranks, and wide receivers have had mixed results. The only primarily defensive Heisman winner, Charles Woodson, had a successful NFL career and final collegiate bowl game appearance. Seven Heisman winners have also been named Associated Press NFL MVP: Paul Hornung, Simpson, Campbell, Allen, Sanders, Cam Newton, and Lamar Jackson. Meanwhile, four have won the Super Bowl Most Valuable Player Award: Staubach, Plunkett, Allen, and Desmond Howard.

The "curse" does not imply that only Heisman winners have failed careers, only the irony behind college football's best underperforming after the award is given.  However, while there are numerous counts of players who underperformed after winning the award, an equal number of players have gone on to see great success, evidence that the "curse" is more of an amusement than a reality.

While there is no statistical or empirical evidence that suggests Heisman winners underperform compared to other high-profile collegiate players, some  try to explain the perception of the curse by reference to trends regarding voter selections. Some see the trend going back decades to other players, but it has most famously been observed since the 1990s.  The accepted logical explanation for the discrepancy between success and failure of Heisman winners is that the people who pick the Heisman are sportswriters and former Heisman winners. This might mean that they vote for a winner based on reputation, without seeing him or really studying him, basically a qualitative approach.  On the other hand, the people who pick players for the NFL are talent evaluators. They study tape, interview players and put them through workouts where their strengths and weaknesses can be quantified.

Heisman Trophy winner's bowl game results

Rankings are from the AP Poll upon entering bowl games
‡—USC's 2005 Orange Bowl win was later vacated.

See also
 List of Heisman Trophy winners

References

Curse
American football-related curses
Curses